Shaun McGrory (born 29 February 1968) is a former professional footballer who played as a left back.

McGrory left his hometown side Coventry and signed for then Football League Division Four side Burnley in 1987, making 59 first-team appearances in three seasons, including the 1988 Football League Trophy Final at Wembley Stadium, where they lost 2–0 to Wolves. McGrory was released by the Clarets in May 1990 and subsequently embarked on a career in non-league football.

References

1968 births
Living people
Footballers from Coventry
English footballers
Association football defenders
English Football League players
Burnley F.C. players
Coventry City F.C. players
Rugby Town F.C. players
Shepshed Dynamo F.C. players